Fei Yu-ching (born Chang Yen-ting  on 17 July 1955), is a Taiwanese former singer and television host.

Early life
Fei Yu-ching was born Chang Yen-ching in Taiwan on 17 July 1955, to Mainlander parents, being the youngest of three children.  His eldest sister Chang Yen-chiung was a singer professionally known as Jenny Fei before becoming a Buddhist nun in 1991 with the dharma name Heng Shu.  His elder brother Chang Fei is also a singer and a television personality.

Career
Fei's career began in 1973, and he began to build a large fan base along with his brother. He performed several theme songs for television shows, some of which were more successful than the shows themselves. He has sung numerous hits such as "Yi Jian Mei" (A Trim of Plum Blossoms), "Ode to the Republic of China", and "Good Night Song", which was composed by the Taiwanese songwriter Liu Chia-chang. This song was chosen by China Television to end each day's broadcast in 1979. It is dubbed as "" (Closing Shop Song) which is played when shops and department stores are about to close for the day. In 1996 at the 7th Golden Melody Awards, his album Good Night Song won Best Mandarin Album and he was nominated for Best Mandarin Male Singer.

From 1993 to 1998, Fei hosted the Taiwan Television prime time variety show The Fantastic Brothers with his brother Chang Fei. He was well known for his witty humor, improvised singing and celebrity impersonations in the show, for which he was nicknamed the （九官鳥）"myna bird". He went on to host several other television music programs, including "Flying to the Rainbow" (飛上彩虹)，"Fei yue xing qi tian" (飛越星期天), "Jin xiao hua yue ye"（今宵花月夜) and "fei yu qing shi jian" (費玉清時間), as well as award-winning "Golden Voice, Golden Award" (金嗓金賞) and "Fei Yu-ching's Music" (費玉清的清音樂).

In 2006, he was featured in a duet, "Faraway", with Jay Chou released in his seventh album Still Fantasy. In February 2008, he performed it during CCTV-4's Chinese New Year special, singing a solo version of "Faraway", which was also performed by Chou later in the program.

Fei announced his retirement from the entertainment industry in September 2018, stating that his farewell concert tour was scheduled for 2019. He held his farewell concert tour in few cities in China, Macau, Malaysia, USA, Canada, Australia, Singapore, Hong Kong and Taiwan. His final concert was held in November in Taiwan. He also completed filming for his TV show "Our Song" with his apprentices Timmy Xu and Ayanga in January 2020, which was originally slated to before his concert but was delayed due to circumstances beyond his control.

In 2020, the song "Yi Jian Mei" (commonly known as "Xue hua piao piao" in the West) became a viral internet meme that reached the top spots on the Spotify Viral 50 chart in countries like Norway, Sweden, Finland, and New Zealand.

Personal life
In 1981, he was engaged to Chie Yasui, a Japanese actress, but he called off the wedding because the Yasui family expected Fei to enter matrilocal residence, switch to Japanese citizenship and give up his career in Taiwan. He remained single thereafter.

References

External links

 Discography at Yesasia.com

1955 births
Living people
Taiwanese male singers